Bisoca is a commune in the north of Buzău County, Muntenia, Romania. It is composed of eight villages: Băltăgari, Bisoca, Lacurile, Lopătăreasa, Pleși, Recea, Sările, and Șindrila.

The commune is traversed on the northern side by the river Râmnicul Sărat, which has its source in nearby Jitia, Vrancea County.

References

Communes in Buzău County
Localities in Muntenia